Masibulele Makepula (born 3 March 1973- 31 October 2022) 
in East London, South Africa) was a professional boxer and later became charismatic pastor.

Amateur Achievements 
Represented South Africa at the 1994 Commonwealth Games in Victoria.
Gold Medalist at the 1995 All-Africa Games in Harare as a Light Flyweight.
Represented South Africa at the 1996 Olympics in Atlanta, Georgia as a Light Flyweight. His results were:
Defeated Debind Thapa (India) TKO 1
Lost to Rafael Lozano (Spain) points

Professional career 
Nicknamed "Hawk", Makepula turned pro in 1996 and captured the vacant WBO light flyweight title with a decision win over Jacob Matlala in 2000. He vacated the title and moved up in weight after the win. In 2006 he lost an eliminator to Jorge Arce by TKO.

See also 
List of light-flyweight boxing champions

External links 
 

1973 births
Living people
Light-flyweight boxers
World light-flyweight boxing champions
Flyweight boxers
World Boxing Organization champions
International Boxing Organization champions
Sportspeople from East London, Eastern Cape
Olympic boxers of South Africa
Boxers at the 1996 Summer Olympics
Boxers at the 1994 Commonwealth Games
Commonwealth Games competitors for South Africa
African Games gold medalists for South Africa
African Games medalists in boxing
South African male boxers
Competitors at the 1995 All-Africa Games